Here's Jaki is an album by pianist Jaki Byard recorded in 1961 and released on the New Jazz label.

Music
"Cinco y Quatro" is a calypso in  time. "Garnerin' a Bit" is a tribute to pianist Erroll Garner. This album is also notable for having the first recorded cover of John Coltrane's jazz composition Giant Steps. The LP's original liner notes state that the composition "D.D.L.J." was named by combining the initials of the first names of Byard, his wife Louise, and the two children they had at the time, Denise and Diane.

Reception

The AllMusic site awarded the album 3 stars, stating "This is no standard trio; they're a collective who romps through these seven selections with a surprise or more a minute".

Track listing 
All compositions by Jaki Byard except as indicated
 "Cinco y Quatro" – 6:26  
 "Mellow Septet" – 5:38  
 "Garnerin' a Bit" – 5:49  
 "Giant Steps" (John Coltrane) – 2:22  
 "Bess, You Is My Woman Now/It Ain't Necessarily So" (George Gershwin, Ira Gershwin) – 9:53  
 "To My Wife" – 5:13  
 "D.D.L.J." – 3:50

Personnel 
Jaki Byard – piano, alto saxophone
Ron Carter – bass
Roy Haynes – drums

References 

Jaki Byard albums
1961 albums
Albums produced by Esmond Edwards
Albums recorded at Van Gelder Studio
New Jazz Records albums